Jeremy Jones may refer to:
Jeremy Jones (freerider) (born 1975), American snowboarder, big mountain riding, Jones Snowboards
Jeremy Jones (freestyler) (born 1976), American freestyle snowboarder
Jeremy Jones (pool player) (born 1971), American pool player
Jeremy Jones (cricketer) (born 1979), Jamaican-born cricketer
Jeremy Neumark Jones, English actor

See also
Jerry Jones (disambiguation)